During the 2022 Russian invasion of Ukraine, Russian troops in the occupied regions of Ukraine have systematically stolen grain and other products from local farmers. According to the Ministry of Defense of Ukraine, as of mid-May 2022, at least 400,000 tons of grain were stolen and exported from Ukraine.  A study by the Kyiv School of Economics found that the Russian invasion cost Ukraine's agricultural sector $4.3 billion in destroyed equipment, damaged land and unharvested crops.

As of October 2022, the widescale theft of Ukrainian grain was continuing and involved both private companies and Russian state operatives. Some of the stolen grain is laundered through transfers and by mixing it with legitimate goods. Financial Times identified Russian businessman Nikita Busel, general director of the government-run State Grain Operator, as one of the heads of the operation.

Until 2022
For eight years, starting in 2014, grain from the self-proclaimed DNR and LNR came to Russia. According to the BBC, intermediaries transported grain from Donbass farmers [to Russia], went through customs, everything was paid for by bank transfer, through Russian banks. They unloaded at the warehouses of Russian buyers, and they were already selling grain as Russian.

References

2022 in Ukraine
Agriculture in Ukraine
Food theft
Grain and the 2022 Russian invasion of Ukraine
Looting in Europe
Russia–Ukraine relations
War crimes during the 2022 Russian invasion of Ukraine